In Morse theory, a mathematical discipline, Jacobi sets provide a method of studying the relationship between two or more Morse functions.

For two Morse functions, the Jacobi set is defined as the set of critical points of the restriction of one function to the level sets of the other function.

The Jacobi set can also be defined as the set of points where the gradients of the two functions are parallel.

If both the functions are generic, the Jacobi set is a smoothly embedded 1-manifold.

Definition 

Consider two generic Morse functions  defined on a smooth -manifold.

References

Morse theory